Johann Hermann von Fersen (c. 1740 – 9 June 1801) was a Saxon-born infantry general who served from 1770 in the Imperial Russian Army.

Life
He was involved in the battles at Larga and Kagul in the military operations against Yemelyan Pugachev. He won the battle in Upper Kuban against Seraskier Batal-Bey and his 18,000 Turks and 15,000 Highlanders, capturing Batal-Bey and his whole camp. In 1792 he was appointed quartermaster-general under Mikhaïl Kretchetnikov in Lithuania and in 1794 he commanded a special corps in Poland.

Under Paul I of Russia he served first as quartermaster-general then commanded the Russian contingent in the failed 1799 Anglo-Russian invasion of Holland. He was defeated at the Battle of Bergen and taken prisoner. Before news of his defeat reached Saint Petersburg, he had been promoted to infantry general, but he was later excluded from service by Tsar Paul.
The captured Hermann was sent to the fortress of Lille. The French were ready to exchange him for all the French generals taken prisoner in Italy, but Paul I did not agree to this, and Herman remained in captivity until the conclusion of peace. Upon his return from captivity, Herman presented an explanation of his actions and on November 6, 1800, he was again allowed into the Russian army, but received no further appointments.

These unfortunate events affected his health, and on 9 June 1801, he died in Saint Petersburg.

Sources
http://www.biografija.ru/show_bio.aspx?id=24220
Russian Biographical Dictionary

1801 deaths
18th-century military personnel from the Russian Empire
18th-century German people
Imperial Russian Army generals
Recipients of the Order of St. George of the Second Degree
Russian people of German descent
German emigrants to the Russian Empire
Saxon nobility
Year of birth uncertain

Johann